Big Hook Wilderness Camp Water Aerodrome , located next to the Big Hook Wilderness Camp in Ontario, Canada, is open from mid-May to mid-October.

The aerodrome operates in unison with Big Hook Wilderness Camps, a fly-in fishing operator, and is located on Central Lake in the Opasquia Provincial Park. Operation dates vary from year to year, mainly due to weather patterns, i.e. ice covering the bodies of water. Stationed at this aerodrome is a Cessna 185 on floats.

Most of the operating season aviation fuel is on hand and available for sale, although in small quantities. Nearby Sandy Lake Water Aerodrome,  due south, typically handles larger quantities of aviation fuel.

References

External links
Official site

Registered aerodromes in Kenora District
Seaplane bases in Ontario